Beta Phi Mu (also  or βφμ) is the international honor society for library & information science and information technology.  Founded by a group of librarians and library educators, the society's express purpose is to recognize and encourage "superior academic achievement" among library and information studies students. Beta Phi Mu now has 39 active chapters in the U.S. and abroad, continues to sponsor various publications and funds several scholarships.

The society's name comes from the initials in the Greek phrase Bibliothekarios philax mathesis, meaning "the librarian is the guardian of knowledge".

Motto and insignia
Aliis inserviendo consumor serves as the society's motto; translated from Latin, it means "consumed in the service of others". Members of the society—librarians and other information professionals—dedicate themselves to serving the information needs of individuals, organizations, and communities.

A dolphin and anchor, the mark of Venetian printer Aldus Manutius, serves as the society's insignia, appearing on various pins, buttons, and similar memorabilia. The society's colors, as signified on honor cords, are purple and white.

Membership
Eligibility for membership in Beta Phi Mu is by invitation of the faculty from an ALA-accredited professional degree program. Invitations are extended only to individuals who complete the requirements for a master's degree and achieve at least a 3.75 (out of 4.0) GPA; invitations are further limited to a maximum of 25% of any given graduating class. Each eligible candidate must also be recommended for election by the faculty of the candidate’s school.

Notable dates
 August 1948 – founding of Beta Phi Mu at the University of Illinois at Urbana-Champaign
 1949 – first initiation is held at Illinois
 1953 – begins publication of its chapbook series
 1954 – presents its first Distinguished Service to Library Education Award
 1956 – the Distinguished Service to Library Education Award becomes an official award of the American Library Association
 1959 – Pi Lambda Sigma, founded in 1903, merges with and becomes a chapter of Beta Phi Mu
 1969 – Beta Phi Mu admitted to the Association of College Honor Societies
 1986 – begins publication of its monograph series (successor to the chapbook series)
 1998 – the society becomes an affiliate of the American Library Association
  2015 - begins publication of its Scholars Series (successor to the monograph series)

Beta Phi Mu Award
The Beta Phi Mu Award is an annual award to a library school faculty member or to an individual for distinguished service to education for librarianship. The first award was made in 1954 to Rudolph Hjalmar Gjelsness Dean of the University of Michigan's Library Science Department from 1940 to 1964.

References

External links
 
 ACHS Beta Phi Mu entry
  Beta Phi Mu chapter list, ACHS

Student organizations established in 1948
Association of College Honor Societies
Library-related organizations
1948 establishments in Illinois